Barry Merrell (born May 16, 1945) is a former professional ice hockey right winger.  He played ten games in the World Hockey Association with the Edmonton Oilers in the 1976–77 season.

External links

1945 births
Living people
Boston Braves (AHL) players
Canadian ice hockey right wingers
Dayton Gems players
Des Moines Oak Leafs players
Edmonton Oilers (WHA) players
Sportspeople from Dauphin, Manitoba
Oklahoma City Blazers (1965–1977) players
Rochester Americans players
Ice hockey people from Manitoba
Canadian expatriate ice hockey players in the United States